Glåmos Church is a parish church of the Church of Norway in the municipality of Røros, Trøndelag county, Norway. It is located in the village of Glåmos. It is the church for the Glåmos parish which is part of the Gauldal prosti (deanery) in the Diocese of Nidaros.

The brown and red wooden church was built in a cruciform style in 1926 under the direction of the architect Claus Hjelte (1884–1969). The church seats about 300 people.

See also
List of churches in Nidaros

References

Røros
Churches in Trøndelag
Cruciform churches in Norway
Wooden churches in Norway
20th-century Church of Norway church buildings
Churches completed in 1926
1926 establishments in Norway